Demand is not a controllable factor; under every situation in different industries, varying demand situations might be encountered. Through demand management it is possible to manipulate the demand in your favor. Most organizations in the beginning face varying demand situations which may not even be favorable to them.

Different types of demand situations

Negative demand: If the market response to a product is negative, it shows that people are not aware of the features of the service and the benefits offered. Under such circumstances, the marketing unit of a service firm has to understand the psyche of the potential buyers and find out the prime reason for the rejection of the service. For example: if passengers refuse a bus conductor's call to board the bus. The service firm has to come up with an appropriate strategy to remove the misunderstandings of the potential buyers. A strategy needs to be designed to transform the negative demand into a positive demand.

No demand: If people are unaware, have insufficient information about a service or due to the consumer's indifference this type of a demand situation could occur. The marketing unit of the firm should focus on promotional campaigns and communicating reasons for potential customers to use the firm's services. Service differentiation is one of the popular strategies used to compete in a no demand situation in the market.

Latent demand:At any given time it is impossible to have a set of services that offer total satisfaction to all the needs and wants of society. In the market there exists a gap between desirables and the availables. There is always a search on for better and newer offers to fill the gap between desirability and availability. Latent demand is a phenomenon of any economy at any given time, it should be looked upon as a business opportunity by service firms and they should orient themselves to identify and exploit such opportunities at the right time. For example, a passenger traveling in an ordinary bus dreams of traveling in a luxury bus. Therefore, latent demand is nothing but the gap between desirability and availability.

Seasonal demand:Some services do not have an all-year-round demand; they might be required only at a certain period of time. Seasons all over the world are very diverse. Seasonal demands create many problems to service organizations, such as: idling the capacity, fixed cost and excess expenditure on marketing and promotions. Strategies used by firms to overcome this hurdle include nurturing the service consumption habit of customers so as to make the demand unseasonal, or recognizing markets elsewhere in the world during the off-season period. Hence, this presents an opportunity to target different markets with the appropriate season in different parts of the world. For example, the need for Christmas cards comes around once a year. Or the, seasonal fruits in a country.

Demand patterns need to be studied in different segments of the market. Service organizations need to constantly study changing demands related to their service offerings over various time periods. They have to develop a system to chart these demand fluctuations, which helps them in predicting the demand cycles. Demands do fluctuate randomly, therefore, they should be followed on a daily, weekly or a monthly basis.

Demand